Prospera Place, formerly known as Skyreach Place, is a 6,886-seat multi-purpose arena, in Kelowna, British Columbia, Canada. It replaced Kelowna Memorial Arena, which is still in use for minor hockey

Opened in 1999, it is home to the Kelowna Rockets hockey club.

The arena hosted the Memorial Cup in 2004. It was supposed to host it again in 2020, but the tournament was canceled due to the COVID-19 pandemic.

Prospera Place was selected to host the 2021 Tim Hortons Brier, the Canadian men's national curling championship, but due to COVID-19 restrictions the Brier took place in Calgary instead.

The arena hosted Skate Canada International in 2014 and again in October 2019.

Prospera Place has hosted concerts by many famous artists, spanning many different genres.

WWE SmackDown! episodes were hosted and taped at the arena in 2003 and 2004.

The So You Think You Can Dance Canada Tour came to the arena in 2009 and 2010.

A multi-story parking garage is situated nearby, as well as a private parking lot made available by the arena for guests who have purchased a parking pass.

Prospera Credit Union obtained naming rights to the arena in 2003, rights it will keep until at least January 2024.

References

External links
Official website of Prospera Place

Indoor arenas in British Columbia
Indoor ice hockey venues in Canada
Sports venues in Kelowna
Western Hockey League arenas
Music venues in British Columbia
Public–private partnership projects in Canada